Madhumagalu was an Indian-Kannada-language family soap opera that premiered on 7 March 2022 and ended on 13 August 2022 on Udaya TV starring Rakshitha, Bhavish Padmajaya and Sirija in lead roles. The show is an official remake of Telugu serial Atho Athamma Kuthuro.

Cast

Main
Rakshitha P as Greeshma
Bhavish Padmajaya as Shishir
Sirija as Madhuvanthi

Supporting
 Ravi Bhat as Narahari
 Mahalakshmi Ursas Yashoda
 Sundar Veena as Chalapathi
 Rekha Rao
 Mico Shivu
 Rajesh S Rao

Cameo appearances
 Vidyashree Jayaram as Kavya
 Sushmitha Bhat as Anjali
 Sharath Kshatriya as Chiranth
 Kavya Shastry as Radhika

Production

Casting
Kannadathi serial fame Bhavish Padmajaya was selected to portray the lead role as Shishir. Rakshitha made her TV acting debut with the series by playing Greeshma. Sirija was selected to portray another leading role and main antagonist Madhuvanthi.

Adaptations

References

2022 Indian television series debuts
Udaya TV original programming
Kannada-language television shows